San Patricio Plaza is a  three-level enclosed shopping mall located in Guaynabo, Puerto Rico. The mall is located at the intersection of PR-2, PR-23, and PR-20, and has over 120 stores with its anchors being T.J. Maxx, Bed, Bath & Beyond, Capri, Walgreens, PetSmart, Caribbean Cinemas and Office Depot, with one vacant anchor spot last occupied by Kmart.

History

During the Spanish Colonial period, Tomás O'Daly was granted land in the vicinity of Guaynabo and O'Daly developed it into a thriving sugar hacienda. O'Daly and fellow Irishman Miguel Kirwan became business partners in the "Hacienda San Patricio" which they named after the chief patron saint of Ireland, Saint Patrick. The plantation no longer exists. The land on which it was located is now a suburb called San Patricio with a shopping mall, San Patricio Plaza. 

San Patricio Plaza was designed and built by Interstate General, who leased the land to the Gonzalez Giusti family during 1964. By the early seventies, because of the high interest rates and oil costs, Interstate General decided to sell certain properties, including San Patricio Plaza, to the Giusti family.

At that time San Patricio Plaza was a strip mall with four large buildings with shops in each of them, all united by common hallways. The main shops were Kmart, Pueblo Supermarket, Walgreens and New York Department Store. 

During the night of December 31, 1968, a fire consumed the building where Kmart was located. As a result, the mall's management decided to enclose the facilities becoming one of the first enclosed malls in Puerto Rico.

In 1989, the mall changed its logo for the first time ever, for its 25th anniversary. Also, Galería San Patricio opened in 1991.

In 1994, the mall changed its logo once again; also, the mall was given a $43 million renovation and expansion. A Food Court opened the same year. Also, the mall's first St. Patrick's Day celebrations were held in March 1995. The mall also introduced its "Patrick" character.
A Caribbean Cinemas location opened in 1997.

In 2003, the access control system was added to the mall. Also, a Bed Bath and Beyond location was opened.
In late 2008, San Patricio Plaza was expanded once again, and some signage was replaced.

In 2008, a Circuit City store opened at the mall. It later closed in early 2009 after it declared bankruptcy.

On August 28, 2012, San Patricio Plaza announced a renovation of its Food Court, pedestrian bridge and multifloor parking. By January 2013, the remodelation was completed.

On October 22, 2014, the mall changed its logo again for its 50th anniversary. The entire San Patricio Village was also given a repainting that began in early 2014, replacing the old beige, pink and green color scheme that had been used since 1994, with a new green, yellow and white color scheme. The rest of the mall's 2nd floor, that had remained unremodeled in 2012, was remodeled as well. The mall celebrated the 50th anniversary with an exhibit about its history, and a time capsule which contains items from the mall’s first 50 years that will open in 2064. A replica of the mall’s original sign was created for the exhibition, which was later moved to the pedestrian bridge in 2016. 
The exhibit partially closed in 2015. Visitors could still see the history showcase until 2018, when the remains of the exhibit were removed in favor of a larger AT&T location.

On January 12, 2017, it was announced that the mall would undergo a $4 million renovation in order to look more modern. It included a new fountain, a new central atrium, new stairs, replacement of flooring and ceiling, exterior improvements, and more. The six ad banners on the fountain area were also removed; and the pink elevator in front of the fountain was demolished. The project officially began on January 17, 2017. The interior was originally expected to be completed in November 2017; however it was completed in March 2018 due delays caused by Hurricane Maria. In February 2018, the mall started a campaign promoting their then-newly-renovated image. A reinauguration ceremony was held in April 2018. The exterior improvements began in August 2017 and were completed in November 2018.

In July 2018, the Caribbean Cinemas location closed for a renovation. The details about the upcoming location were announced in October. It was originally expected to reopen in December 2018, but it actually opened in February 2019. The new location is a Caribbean Cinemas VIP, with reclining seats and a hall sponsored by Alfa Romeo.

In October 2018 the mall started a project called “Muraleo” that added paintings across the mall. The project has been repeated with different editions in October of every year since then.

The mall's Kmart store closed in February 2019. On December 5, 2019, it was announced that Kmart's former space would be remodeled into an area called "The Square @ San Patricio Plaza", with an investment of $12 million. The rest of the mall will remain the same. Construction was expected to begin in early 2020 and would have been completed in late 2020, but due to the COVID-19 pandemic, this project was postponed for a year. Several enhancements would be made to the Village as well. Finally, on October 20, 2020, it was announced that the mall’s Village enhancement project would start and would be made in collaboration with Guaynabo’s government.  

The old Kmart building’s demolition began in May 2021, and was completed in September 2021, officially beginning the construction of “The Square” area after a year-long pause.

Feliciliandia
Opened in 1972, Felicilandia, an amusement park, was located on the grounds of the San Patricio Plaza for about two decades. 

In 1991, a storage building behind Felicilandia was bought by the owners of San Patricio Plaza and converted into another part of the mall, a two story building right by the amusement park which added eight stores and offices to the mall.

Felicilandia was a year-round attraction which remained open for two decades. When it closed in the mid 1990s, some of the amusement rides were relocated for use elsewhere.

An exhibit at the San Patricio Plaza created in 2014 and closed in 2018 included pictures and a little history of when Felicilandia was there. Located in Guaynabo, a highly populated municipality, Felicilandia is a place steeped in nostalgia for some residents of Puerto Rico.

The park had a ferris wheel, bumper cars, mini-planes, a main roller coaster, a children's roller coaster, a children's ride where kids could drive cars up and down a play mountain, with a bridge included.

Current anchors
Bed Bath & Beyond,
TJ Maxx
Capri
Walgreens
Caribbean Cinemas

Outparcels 
PetSmart
Office Depot

Former anchors
Kmart
Pueblo Supermarkets
Circuit City
New York Department Store

See also
Plaza Las Americas
Plaza del Sol

References

External links
 Vocero.com
 Elnuevodia.com

1964 establishments in Puerto Rico
Buildings and structures in Guaynabo, Puerto Rico
Shopping malls established in 1964
Shopping malls in Puerto Rico